Frederikssund IK is a Danish football club currently playing in the Denmark Series. They play at Frederikssund Stadion in Frederikssund on Zealand, which has a capacity of 1,200.

References

External links
Official site

Football clubs in Denmark
Association football clubs established in 1898
Frederikssund Municipality
1898 establishments in Denmark